The following lists events that happened during 1919 in Australia.

Incumbents

Monarch – George V
Governor-General – Sir Ronald Munro-Ferguson
Prime Minister – Billy Hughes
Chief Justice – Samuel Griffith (until 17 October) then Adrian Knox (from 18 October)

State premiers
Premier of New South Wales – William Holman
Premier of Queensland – T. J. Ryan (until 22 October), then Ted Theodore
Premier of South Australia – Archibald Peake
Premier of Tasmania – Walter Lee
Premier of Victoria – Harry Lawson
Premier of Western Australia – Sir Henry Lefroy (until 17 April), then Sir Hal Colebatch (until 17 May), then James Mitchell

State governors
Governor of New South Wales – Walter Davidson
Governor of Queensland – Hamilton Goold-Adams
Governor of South Australia – Sir Henry Galway
Governor of Tasmania – Francis Newdegate
Governor of Victoria – Sir Arthur Stanley
Governor of Western Australia – William Ellison-Macartney

Events
 8 January – Strike leader Paul Freeman was arrested outside of Dobbyn, Queensland, sparking a chain of events that would lead to his deportation.
 1 March – The Potts, believed to be the world's longest running cartoon strip drawn by the same artist, is first published in The Sun News-Pictorial.
 24 March – one of the most notable incidents of the Red Flag Riots occurred in Brisbane, Queensland, when a crowd of returned servicemen clashed with police. The incident had been sparked the previous day by a socialist demonstration against the continued operation of the War Precautions Act, which had angered many of the returned soldiers.
 1 June – A mutiny breaks out on the Royal Australian Navy battlecruiser  shortly after it arrives in Fremantle, Western Australia.
 28 June – The Treaty of Versailles is signed in France, bringing Australia's involvement in World War I to an end.
 18 October – Sir Adrian Knox is appointed Chief Justice of the High Court.
 28 October – The Treaty of Peace (Germany) Act 1919 receives Royal Assent, confirming Australia's membership as a sovereign nation in the new League of Nations, and indicating Australia's independence from the United Kingdom.
 10 December – Keith and Ross Smith, piloting a Vickers Vimy, reach Darwin at the end of the first England to Australia flight.
 19 December – A federal election is held. The incumbent Nationalist Party of Billy Hughes defeats the Australian Labor Party of Frank Tudor.
 24 December – The Electrical Trades Union of Australia is federally registered under the Commonwealth Conciliation and Arbitration Act, 1904.
 The worldwide Spanish flu epidemic continues, eventually claiming almost 12,000 lives in Australia.
 At the Paris Peace Conference, 1919 Australian delegates succeed in excluding recognition of the principle of racial equality in the League of Nations Covenant.

Arts and literature

10 September – J. F. Archibald, founding editor of The Bulletin dies, bequeathing money which would be used to award the Archibald Prize for portraiture.
Elioth Gruner wins the Wynne Prize for his work, Spring Frost.

Film
 4 October – The Sentimental Bloke premieres in Melbourne.

Sport
Balmain win the 1919 NSWRFL Premiership
11 November – Artilleryman wins the Melbourne Cup
January 1919 – A.R.F. Kingscote wins the Australian Open

Births
6 January – Geoffrey Bingham, author and Anglican minister (died 2009)
3 February – Bill Alley, cricketer (died 2004)
16 February – Keith Carmody, cricketer (died 1977)
22 February – Mary Maguire, actress (died 1974)
1 March – Reg Sprigg, geologist (died 1994)
20 March – Pat Norton, backstroke swimmer (died 2007)
25 March – Arthur Wade, NSW politician (died 2014)
28 March – Tom Brooks, cricketer (died 2007)
10 April – Vernon Wilcox, politician (died 2004)
1 May – Lance Barnard, Deputy Prime Minister (died 1997)
15 May – Tom Drake-Brockman, politician (died 1992)
22 May – Peter Howson, politician (died 2009)
28 May – Olga Masters, writer (died 1986)
30 May – Jim Miller, Australian rules footballer
24 June – Fabian "Fabe" McCarthy, rugby union footballer (died 2008)
6 July – Edward Kenna, Second World War VC recipient (died 2009)
15 July – Harcourt Dowsley, sportsman (died 2014)
14 September – Gil Langley, cricketer (died 2001)
6 October – Abe Saffron, Sydney crime figure (died 2006)
7 October – Zelman Cowen, Governor General of Australia (died 2011)
5 November – Thomas O'Dwyer, cricketer (died 2005)
19 November – Margaret Whitlam, wife of Gough Whitlam (died 2012)
28 November – Keith Miller, pilot and sportsman (died 2004)
7 December – Wilfred Arthur, World War II fighter ace (died 2000)
10 December – Jean Lee, last woman executed in Australia (died 1951)
17 December – Geraldine Halls (pen name: Charlotte Jay), mystery novelist (died 1996)
29 December – Malcolm Mackay, politician (died 1999)

Deaths

 9 January – Robert Harper, Victorian politician (born in the United Kingdom) (b. 1842)
 4 February – Richard Bowyer Smith, inventor (born in the United Kingdom) (b. 1837)
 20 March – Sir Edward Charles Stirling, anthropologist (b. 1848)
 11 May – Simon Fraser, Australian rules footballer (Essendon), rower and ice hockey player (b. 1886)
 8 June – Sir Henry Briggs, Western Australian politician (born in the United Kingdom) (b. 1844)
 21 June – Sir Thomas à Beckett, solicitor and judge (born in the United Kingdom) (b. 1836)
 25 July – Sir Samuel McCaughey, New South Wales politician, pastoralist and philanthropist (born in Ireland) (b. 1835)
 30 July – Sir Simon Fraser, Victorian politician, pastoralist and businessman (born in Canada) (b. 1832)
 4 August – Dave Gregory, cricketer (b. 1845)
 10 September – J. F. Archibald, publisher and journalist (b. 1856)
 12 September – Sir John Mark Davies, Victorian politician (born in the United Kingdom) (b. 1840)
 24 September – Frank Laver, cricketer and baseball player (b. 1869)
 29 September – Edward Pulsford, New South Wales politician (born in the United Kingdom) (b. 1844)
 7 October – Alfred Deakin, 2nd Prime Minister of Australia (b. 1856)
 13 October – Henry Saunders, Western Australian politician (born in the United Kingdom) (b. 1855)
 25 October – William Kidston, 17th Premier of Queensland (born in the United Kingdom) (b. 1849)
 2 November – Mephan Ferguson, manufacturer (born in the United Kingdom) (b. 1843)
 20 December – Sir Philip Fysh, 12th Premier of Tasmania (born in the United Kingdom) (b. 1835)
 25 December – Sir Edwin Thomas Smith, South Australian politician, brewer and businessman (born in the United Kingdom) (b. 1830)

See also
 List of Australian films of the 1910s

References

 
Australia
Years of the 20th century in Australia